All Saints Catholic High School is a Knowsley based Roman Catholic secondary school educating pupils aged 11–18 years of age in the Kirkby area of Merseyside, England. The school also operates a sixth form.

History
All Saints CCfL opened on 11 January 2010, following the closure of the Bewley Drive site in December 2009. The Bewley Drive site closed because of Knowsley's Building schools for the future scheme. All Saints followed the other 10 Knowsley schools in creating 7 new "centres for learning".

Former schools
St Gregory's School on Bewley Drive in Southdene, Kirkby merged with St Kevin's School Northwood to form All Saints Catholic High School. St Gregory's School was the first girls' catholic comprehensive school in England, in Southdene. St Kevin's RC School had over 2000 boys, and was the largest comprehensive school in England.

Notable former pupils

St Gregory's Catholic School
 Angela Clarke (British actress)
 Margi Clarke, actress
 Sharon Maughan actress, married to Trevor Eve, and has the daughter Alice Eve, and is mostly known for her work with Anthony Head as the 1990s Gold Blend couple
 Tricia Penrose, actress who plays Gina Ward in Heartbeat

St Kevin's RC School
 Nicky Allt, playwright
 John Conteh, boxer
 Terry McDermott, footballer
 Phil Redmond, television drama producer, known for Grange Hill, Brookside and Hollyoaks
 Andrew Schofield (actor), starred in Alan Bleasdale's Scully (TV series)
 Ed Sweeney (trade unionist), General Secretary from 1999 to 2004 of UNIFI (trade union)

All Saints Catholic High School

Leighton baines (footballer)

Joel waldron (football scout)

See also
 St Gregory's Catholic School, Kent
 St Gregory's Roman Catholic Science College, north-west London

References

External links
 Archdiocese of Liverpool

Catholic secondary schools in the Archdiocese of Liverpool
Educational institutions established in 2010
2010 establishments in England
Secondary schools in the Metropolitan Borough of Knowsley
Voluntary aided schools in England